Grid Legends (stylised as GRID Legends) is a 2022 racing video game developed by Codemasters and published by Electronic Arts. It is the fifth instalment in the Grid franchise. The game was released for Microsoft Windows, PlayStation 4, PlayStation 5, Xbox One and Xbox Series X/S on February 25, 2022. On January 12, 2023, the game was released for Meta Quest 2.

Gameplay
Grid Legends contains more than 130 tracks to race on, ranging from real-life circuits like Brands Hatch, Indianapolis Motor Speedway, Suzuka International Racing Course and the return of Mount Panorama Circuit, to street circuits in various cities such as San Francisco, Paris, London, and Moscow. The game features more than 100 vehicles, including touring cars, semi-trailer truck, open-wheel car, stadium trucks, drift cars, and even electric vehicles, to compete in arena ovals, on street circuits, or off-road tracks.  For the first time in the series, players have the ability to create their own races, including custom routes, obstacles, vehicle restrictions, and rules.

Inspired by Netflix's documentary series Formula 1: Drive to Survive, the game includes a story-focused career mode for the first time in the series, entitled "Driven to Glory". Codemasters had previously opted to include a plot-focused career mode in F1 2021 with Braking Point. In Grid Legends however, the mode is much more narrative-focused, with the story in particular focusing on an unnamed racing driver referred to only as "Driver 22" (named after the driver's race number and the fact that the game supports for up to 22 players). A number of professional actors have been hired to portray different characters in the game, utilizing the same virtual set technology used in the American Space Western television series The Mandalorian to insert the actors into virtual backgrounds. The cast includes actor Ncuti Gatwa, who portrays Valentin Manzi, number one driver for Voltz Racing.  Grid Legends also marks the first physical appearance of Nathan McKane, who has been a staple character throughout the GRID series, portrayed by Callum McGowan and reprising his role of number one driver for Ravenwest Motorsport. Other major characters include: Ryan McKane (Ravenwest Motorsport's team owner and Nathan's uncle; he previously appeared in TOCA Race Driver, potrayed by Joseph Millson), Lara Carvalho (Ravenwest number two driver, potrayed by Nicole Castillo-Mavromatis), Marcus Ado (Seneca Racing's team principal, potrayed by Miles Yekinni), Ajeet Singh (Seneca lead engineer, potrayed by Devesh Kishore), Yume Tanaka (Seneca number one driver and Driver 22's teammate, portrayed by Natsumi Kuroda) and Claire Webb (Grid TV's announcer, potrayed by Sara Vickers).

Development and release
Grid Legends was announced at EA Play Live 2021. It is the fifth video game of the Grid series developed by Codemasters and the first instalment published by Electronic Arts, making this the series' debut on EA's Origin as their main platform, which is also playable on the EA desktop app. Previous entries in the series were only on Steam. In addition to be released on Microsoft Windows, PlayStation 4 and Xbox One platforms, the game is also set to come to the ninth generation of video game consoles PlayStation 5 and Xbox Series X/S for the first time in the franchise. The game was released on February 25, 2022. On January 12, 2023, the game was released for the Meta Quest 2.

Updates and downloadable content
The game received a downloadable content pack, as Electronic Arts and Codemasters put out an expansion for this Grid title, including Classic Car-Nage story mode, as it featured Demolition Derby cars and tracks, as well as the new Demolition Derby mode and the Valentin Manzi's presentation cutscenes.

The second downloadable content, named Enduring Sprint, was released on October 25, 2022. It features a new track, Fuji Speedway, the new Endurance mode and its cutscenes that include Lara Carvalho and Yume Tanaka's new teamwork with Seneca Racing, as well as four new cars, such as Autozam AZ-1, Bentley Continental GT3, Bentley Speed 8, and BMW V12 LMR.

The third downloadable content, The Rise of Ravenwest was released on November 17, 2022, as it featured a new track, the Miami circuit from Grid 2 and its cutscenes that include a tell-all interview on the McKane's family in Grid history, as well as new cars, including BMW 320 Turbo Group 5, Plymouth GTX and Corvette C2.

The fourth and final downloadable content, Winter Bash was released on January 27, 2023. It features new Okutama point-to-point drift courses and three new cars, such as Bugatti Bolide, BMW 2002 and a custom drift-tuned SRT Viper GTS, as well as the Ajeet Singh's presentation cutscenes with occasional help from Manzi.

Reception 

Grid Legends received "generally favorable" reviews for Windows and PlayStation 5 and "mixed or average" reviews for the Xbox Series X/S version.

IGN gave the game a 7 out of 10, stating, "It’s not obvious at first glance, but Grid Legends is a definite step up from Grid 2019, with a bigger collection of circuits, more race types, and some extremely clever hop-in multiplayer. It’s not a dramatic leap, though, particularly as the reused car roster grows stale and the customisation options tread water." Eurogamer wrote, "There's significant duplication from 2019's series reboot, but the few additions are at least wilder and more specialised than that game's slightly more conservative platter," and praised the multiplayer, story mode, race creator mode, and atmosphere. Both outlets also heavily praised the game's newly unpredictable AI. Push Square gave the game 7 stars out of 10 and praised the core gameplay, number of cars and tracks, accessibility, and well-executed adaptive trigger usage while criticizing the story mode's narrative, unremarkable visuals, and repetitive music. GamesRadar+ gave it 4 stars out of 5 and lauded the tight controls and simcade-style racing while criticizing the "dodgy" AI and disappointing story.

References

External links
 

2022 video games
Codemasters games
Electronic Arts games
Ego (game engine) games
Grid (series)
MacOS games
Multiplayer and single-player video games
PlayStation 4 games
PlayStation 5 games
Racing video games
Split-screen multiplayer games
Video games set in Austria
Video games set in Australia
Video games set in Chicago
Video games set in China
Video games set in Cuba
Video games set in Dubai
Video games set in England
Video games set in Indianapolis
Video games set in Italy
Video games set in Japan
Video games set in London
Video games set in Malaysia
Video games set in Miami
Video games set in Moscow
Video games set in Nevada
Video games set in Paris
Video games set in San Francisco
Video games set in Shanghai
Video games set in Spain
Video games set in Sydney
Video games set in Yokohama
Video games set in the United Kingdom
Windows games
Xbox One games
Xbox Series X and Series S games
Video games developed in the United Kingdom